Erfjord is a former municipality in Rogaland county, Norway. The  municipality existed from 1914 until 1965.  It encompassed the area around the Erfjorden in the southwestern part of the present-day municipality of Suldal.  The administrative centre of the municipality was the village of Hålandsosen, where the Erfjord Church is located.

History
The municipality of Erfjord was created on 1 January 1914, when the municipality of Jelsa was split in two: the western part remained as Jelsa, and the eastern part became Erfjord. Initially, Erfjord had 617 inhabitants.  On 1 January 1965, a major municipal consolidation took place due to the recommendations of the Schei Committee.  Erfjord municipality ceased to exist and it was merged with the municipalities of Sand and Suldal as well as part of the municipalities of Jelsa and Imsland to form the new (much larger) municipality of Suldal.  At the time of its dissolution, Erfjord had 610 residents.

Government
All municipalities in Norway, including Erfjord, are responsible for primary education (through 10th grade), outpatient health services, senior citizen services, unemployment and other social services, zoning, economic development, and municipal roads.  The municipality is governed by a municipal council of elected representatives, which in turn elects a mayor.

Municipal council
The municipal council  of Erfjord was made up of representatives that were elected to four year terms.  The party breakdown of the final municipal council was as follows:

See also
List of former municipalities of Norway

References

Suldal
Former municipalities of Norway
1914 establishments in Norway
1965 disestablishments in Norway